National Changgeuk Company of Korea is a changgeuk organization founded in 1962 with the objective of "reviving the beauty and spirit of Korean songs."

See also
National Theater of Korea
Music of Korea
Contemporary culture of South Korea
Korean theater

References

External links
Official site

Korean music
Theatre in Korea
1962 establishments in South Korea

ko:국립중앙극장